The European Small Business Alliance (ESBA) is a non-party political European group, which cares for small business entrepreneurs and the self-employed, and represents them through targeted EU advocacy activities. ESBA also works towards the development of strong independent advocacy and benefits groups in European countries.

ESBA is one of the largest organisations based on voluntary membership in Europe. Through its direct membership, associate membership and cooperation agreements, ESBA today represents almost one million small businesses and covers 36 European countries.

ESBA was founded in 1998.

References
"ESBA, A New European Association for Small Firms". European Report. 27 January 1999. HighBeam
"European Small Business Alliance of Small and Medium Independent Enterprises - ESBA" in The European Union Encyclopedia and Directory 1999. Third Edition. Europa Publications Limited. 1999. . Page 389.
Kevin Brown. "Smaller businesses fight for less EU regulation". Financial Times. 23 January 1999. p 6 (UK edition).

External links
Official Website
Global Group

European trade associations
Employers' organizations
Cross-European advocacy groups
Small business